Maturo is a surname. Notable people with the surname include:

August Maturo (born 2007), American actor
Joseph A. Maturo Jr. (born  1951), American politician
James Maturo ( 1878–?), American billiards champion

See also
Maduro